The Antigua and Barbuda Labour Party (ABLP) is a political party in Antigua and Barbuda. The current leader of the party is Gaston Browne, who serves as the Prime Minister of Antigua and Barbuda. The party had previously been led by Lester Bird, who was chairman of the party since 1971, and became Prime Minister and political leader in 1994.

History 
The party was founded in 1946, during the first national elections, as the Antigua Labour Party (ALP).  Its founders included Vere Bird, father of Lester. The ABLP later came to be seen as a political arm of the Bird family. With the exception of five years in the 1970s, the ABLP ruled Antigua and Barbuda for over four decades leading up to 2004. It was in the opposition from 2004 to 2014, and then returned to power in the 2014 general election.

2004 defeat 
Two major events precipitated the ABLP's first defeat in 28 years in the 2004 elections. First, an Electoral Commission was introduced after the 1999 election. According to international observers, the 1999 election was rife with irregularities. The report from an observer group from across the Commonwealth concluded that "voting rolls appeared to be inflated" and recommended "the establishment of an independent electoral commission to improve the voter registration process." Second, in 2002 there was a scandal over medical benefits, in which the government failed to contribute EC$120 million to cover recipients' medical expenses.

The opposition United Progressive Party campaigned on an anti-corruption platform they called "Government in the Sunshine." The ABLP lost its majority in the general election held on 24 March 2004. It received 41.8% of the popular vote, but won only four out of 17 seats. ABLP Prime Minister and political leader Bird was also defeated in his constituency.

Leadership crisis and transition 
In early 2009, the Antigua and Barbuda Labour Party faced an internal leadership crisis. There was speculation that even if the ABLP won the 2009 election, Bird's leadership would be challenged. He announced that, if the ABLP failed to win the forthcoming 2009 general election, he would step down. Nevertheless, despite not winning, he remained the ABLP's leader until 2012, when he was defeated by Gaston Browne in a leadership challenge.

2014 elections and return to government 
The Antigua and Barbuda Labour Party won 14 of the 17 seats in the Legislature in the 2014 general elections, forming a majority government with Browne as Prime Minister. They won 15 seats in the 2018 general elections and thereby retained power.

Electoral results

House of Representatives

Barbuda Council

See also
:Category:Antigua and Barbuda Labour Party politicians

References 

Labour parties
Political parties in Antigua and Barbuda
Political parties established in 1946
Republicanism in the Commonwealth realms
Republican parties
Social democratic parties in North America